Lost Boys of Sudan is a documentary film by Megan Mylan and Jon Shenk about two Dinka boys from Sudan, Santino Majok Chuor and Peter Nyarol Dut, who reached the United States after fleeing the civil war in their country. "Orphaned as young boys" in the Second Sudanese Civil War they "survived lion attacks and militia gunfire to reach a refugee camp in Kenya along with thousands of other children."

The documentary's title “Lost Boys of Sudan” was originally the name given to the group of Southern Sudanese youth by United Nations aid workers who were monitoring their flight from Sudan.

See also
 Lost Boys of Sudan
 Forced displacement in popular culture
 The Good Lie

References

External links 
Lost Boys of Sudan Film
Lost Boys of Sudan on PBS's P.O.V.
Lost Boys of Sudan in IMDb
Actual Films
Principe Productions

Lost Boys of Sudan
Films set in South Sudan
2003 films
Arabic-language films
Swahili-language films
Dinka-language films
POV (TV series) films
Documentary films about child refugees
American documentary films
2003 documentary films
Documentary films about Sudan
Films shot in Houston
2000s English-language films
2000s American films